The 14 September 2004 Baghdad bombing was a suicide car bomb attack on a market, near a police headquarters, in Baghdad, the capital city of Iraq, on 14 September 2004, killing 47 people and wounding 114.

References

2004 murders in Iraq
21st-century mass murder in Iraq
Mass murder in 2004
Suicide car and truck bombings in Iraq
Suicide bombings in Baghdad
Terrorist incidents in Iraq in 2004
Terrorist incidents in Baghdad
2000s in Baghdad
September 2004 events in Iraq
Marketplace attacks in Iraq